Cyclopalpia is a genus of snout moths. It was described by George Hampson in 1897.

Species
Cyclopalpia monotonalis Dyar, 1914
Cyclopalpia violescens Hampson, 1897

References

Chrysauginae
Pyralidae genera